Liliana Colanzi Serrate (born 1981) is a Bolivian writer.

Life
Colanzi was born in Santa Cruz, Bolivia, in 1981, and studied at the Private University of Santa Cruz de la Sierra (UPSA) and the University of Cambridge. She obtained a doctorate in Comparative Literature from Cornell University, where she now teaches.

She is the author of three collections of short stories: Vacaciones permanentes (2010), La ola (2014), and Nuestro mundo muerto (2016), the last of which has been translated into English by Jessica Sequeira. 

In 2017, Colanzi was named as one of the Bogota39, a selection of the best young writers in Latin America.

References

Bolivian short story writers
Bolivian women short story writers
21st-century Bolivian women writers
21st-century Bolivian writers
21st-century short story writers
People from Santa Cruz de la Sierra
Alumni of the University of Cambridge
Cornell University alumni
Cornell University faculty
1981 births
Living people